The Copa Dominicana de Futbol is the top football tournament in the Dominican Republic. Created in 2015, it is open to all clubs and is affiliated with the Dominican Football Federation.

2015 Tournament

Group A:
Universidad O&M F.C. (runners-up), Atletico FC, Unev FC, Garrincha FC

Grupo B:
Dimport Inter FC, Campa FC, El Bien FC, Soles Bob FC

Grupo C:'
Deportivo Cóndor, Unión VPN FC, Realiste FC, Cibao FC (champions), Salcedo FC

Grupo D:
Club 6 de Febrero, Cibao Atlético, La Herradura, Los 30 de Villa Tapia

Most Goals

Tournament
2015 : Cibao FC
2016 : Cibao FC

Top goalscorers

References

External links
http://www.futboltotalrd.com/p/copa-dominicana-goleadores-temporada.html 
http://ldf.com.do/primera-version-copa-dominicana-de-futbol/
http://almomento.net/copa-dominicana-de-futbol-con-mejores-equipos-rd/149555
http://www.balompiedominicano.com/2015/11/copa-dominicana-de-futbol-continua-este.html
http://www.diariolibre.com/deportes/futbol/om-y-atletico-fc-inician-copa-dominicana-de-futbol-IB1726813

Football competitions in the Dominican Republic